Orton is a civil parish in the Eden District, Cumbria, England.  It contains 15 listed buildings that are recorded in the National Heritage List for England.  Of these, two are listed at Grade II*, the middle of the three grades, and the others are at Grade II, the lowest grade.  The parish contains the village of Orton, and smaller settlements including Kelleth, Raisbeck, and Greenholme, but is almost completely rural.  Most of the listed buildings are houses and associated structures, farmhouses and farm buildings.  The other listed buildings are a church, a packhorse bridge, a marker stone, and two former schools.


Key

Buildings

References

Citations

Sources

Lists of listed buildings in Cumbria
Listed buildings